

Participating teams

First round

Group 1

|}

Group 2

|}

1 Gabon failed to appear for the match; Cameroon were awarded a 2–0 victory and advanced.

Group 3

|}

Second round

Group 1

Group 2

Group 3

1 The match was abandoned after Magalasy immigration officials refused the Sudanese team entry into the country following mass protests; Sudan were awarded the match 2–0.

References 

Football qualification for the 1972 Summer Olympics
Football at the Summer Olympics – Men's African Qualifiers